Jiaoxi is a railway station on the Taiwan Railways Administration Yilan line. It is located in Jiaoxi Township, Yilan County, Taiwan.

History
The station was opened on 15 November 1919.

Around the station
 Fo Guang University

See also
 List of railway stations in Taiwan

References

1919 establishments in Taiwan
Railway stations in Yilan County, Taiwan
Railway stations opened in 1919
Railway stations served by Taiwan Railways Administration